Kwon Eun-ji (born 13 December 2002) is a South Korean sport shooter. She represented South Korea at the 2020 Summer Olympics in Tokyo 2021, where she placed 7th in women's 10 metre air rifle.

References

 

2002 births
Living people
South Korean female sport shooters
Shooters at the 2020 Summer Olympics
Olympic shooters of South Korea
21st-century South Korean women